Putatan is a municipality in the capital of the Putatan district in the West Coast Division of Sabah, Malaysia. Its population was estimated to be around 100,000 in 2021. It is one of the satellite town of Kota Kinabalu metropolitan area together with neighbouring Petagas town. Putatan railway station is one of the stops for Sabah State Railway while INTI College Sabah Campus became the main campus for Kota Kinabalu in Putatan town.

References

External links 

Putatan District
Towns in Sabah